St. Dimitrija Solunski (Macedonian: Св. Димитриј Солунски), also known as St. Demetrius of Salonica, is a Macedonian Orthodox Church located in Markham, Ontario, Canada.

History
Before the church was built, a Macedonian organization in the Markham region existed since 1988.  In 1989, the numbers of Macedonian Canadians grew large enough to support a church environment. Actions were put forth to gather enough financial resources with the aid of many Macedonian Canadians. Enough financial resources were gathered and a property was purchased in the year of 1993.

The existing building was demolished on May 15, 1994, and the new foundation was blessed by the Archbishop of Ohrid and Macedonia Michael, who was also the Prelate for the American-Canadian Macedonian Orthodox Diocese.
On the 7th of August, 1994, the first holy liturgy was carried out in the newly built church.

In the church there is a women's auxiliary, a soccer team, a church choir, a Macedonian school with religious classes, a literary club, and a senior citizens club. Within the lower level of the church building there is a banquet hall. The church also participates in annual cultural events organized by the city of Markham.

The church has been recently featured in many Canadian newspapers, including the Toronto Star, for its magnificent Byzantine-style frescos and iconography painted by the Macedonian artist Georgi Danevski.

See also
St. Clement of Ohrid Macedonian Orthodox Church, Toronto
St. Ilija Macedonian Orthodox Church, Mississauga

References

External links
Official Church Website
Official Website of the American-Canadian Macedonian Orthodox Diocese
Official Website of the Macedonian Orthodox Church
Article in the Toronto Star

Macedonian-Canadian culture
Macedonian Orthodox churches in Canada
Churches in Ontario
Buildings and structures in Markham, Ontario
Tourist attractions in Markham, Ontario
1994 establishments in Ontario